Charles Perrot (1642 – 10 June 1686) was an English politician. He was Member of Parliament for Oxford University from 1679 until his death.

Perrot was educated at St John's College, Oxford, and became a fellow in 1664.

References

1642 births
1686 deaths
Fellows of St John's College, Oxford
Members of the pre-1707 Parliament of England for the University of Oxford